The Northern Counties Committee (NCC) Class U2 4-4-0 passenger steam locomotives consisted of 18 locomotives built for service in north-east Ireland. Ten of the engines were new builds supplied by the North British Locomotive Company (NBL) or constructed at the NCC's York Road works.  The remainder were rebuilds of existing locomotives.

History

Class U2 was numerically the largest class of locomotives on the NCC, only being equalled when the last of the Class WT 2-6-4 tank engines was delivered in 1950. The first of the class was built in 1924 and construction continued over the following thirteen years until the last engine was outshopped in 1937.

The Class U2 engines can be divided into four sub classes as follows:

 7 New engines built by the North British Locomotive Company, Glasgow
 3 New engines built by the NCC at York Road works, Belfast
 4 Renewals of Class A engines
 4 Rebuilds of Class U engines

The renewals were an accounting device to avoid the capital charges associated with building new engines; it is unlikely that much of the original engines was incorporated into the resulting U2s.

The engines were simples, i.e. not compound, with two  inside cylinders. All eighteen engines, though differing slightly in appearance had, until 1945, the same power output. The only dimensional difference was caused by six boilers, identical with the others, except that the opportunity had  been taken for the first time with a Derby boiler to use the broader Irish gauge to full advantage for a wider firebox. The first two of these G7S boilers were fitted to Class A "Heavy Compounds" Nos.67 and 59 when they were renewed as Class U2 in 1934.

Two years later, four more of this type of boiler were ordered when No.87 was constructed out of Class A No.63 and Nos.72 and 73 were rebuilt from Class U to U2. The remaining boiler was presumably to have a been a spare one to enable speed shopping of engines but in the event it was immediately fitted to No.78. This engine was the last of the NBL engines to be built in 1924 but she had run a considerably greater mileage than other members of the class by the time she received the new boiler in October 1936.
 
No.70 did not have its footplate altered when it was rebuilt from Class U to U2; the short footplate made it unpopular with locomotive crews as the cab became very warm in summer and the position of some of the controls, especially the reversing lever, was cramped. It had the same nominal weight, 51 long tons 10 cwt, as the rest of the class,

Apart from a slight difference in the cab, the superb external finish of the NBL engines appears to have given them an advantage in prestige among the crews over the three Belfast-built engines. Although less than half of the class had been built in Glasgow, the U2s gained the general nickname of "Scotch Engines".
     
Eleven of the engines were named after Ulster castles and a twelfth, No.87, carried the name Queen Alexandra.

The U2s provided the top-link workings on the NCC until the arrival of the Class W Moguls in 1933. They also worked the Larne Harbour boat trains, being allowed 30 minutes for the 24⅓ miles, again over a route with a significant proportion of single track.

While most of the class were based at Belfast, Nos.70, 73 and 80 were at one time assigned to Larne shed and Nos.74 and 81 were at Coleraine. In later years, No.77 was also based at Coleraine and would be one of the last engines to work a train over the Derry Central line before it closed.

The U2s performed sterling service during the busiest years of World War II. A typical job was to take over a military train at Antrim that had been worked through from the GNR(I). Having hauled eight bogie coaches from Antrim to the summit of the NCC main line, a stop would be made at Ballyclare Junction to attach carriages that had arrived from Derry or Cookstown on a previous train before travelling on to Larne Harbour where it was common to see trains of twelve or more bogie coaches arriving.

It is possible that the cylinders fitted to No.72 came from Class U1 engine No.3 which had just been withdrawn. Originally fitted with Fowler pattern chimneys that had capuchons, some the class, such as No.76, later received a Stanier type and it was said by their crews that they never steamed as well after this alteration.

The Ulster Transport Authority (UTA) arranged a massive sale of withdrawn locomotives in January 1956 which included the first U2s to be withdrawn. These were Nos.70, 79, 82 and 83 at Carrickfergus and Nos.71 and 77 brought up from Ballymena. The remainder of the class were withdrawn over the following seven years. The last to go in June 1962 was No.74 Dunluce Castle which was destined for preservation.

Building and withdrawal data
The following table summarises the building and rebuilding history of the Class U2 locomotives:  
  

 The name Queen Alexandra was transferred from Class A No.34 to No.63 in November 1932.
 Preserved.

An Irish 2P?
The NCC's Class U2 locomotives showed a strong Midland Railway influence in their design and bore a superficial resemblance to the LMS Class 2P 4-4-0 locomotives. However, one should not regard the U2s as an Irish equivalent of the LMS 2P; they were quite different engines. That the two classes had little in common is shown by a comparison of principal dimensions:

Livery

LMS NCC
The Class U2 locomotives were painted in crimson lake (RAL 3002) with yellow and black lining. The LMS crest was carried on the upper cab sides. The initials "NCC" in shaded serif gold capital letters were placed centrally on the tender sides. Number plates were brass with raised digits and edge; they were carried on the lower cab sides with another placed centrally on the back of the tender tank. The named engines carried curved nameplates fitted above the leading driving wheel splashers. Buffer beams and number plate and name plate backgrounds were painted red. The engine number was applied to the front buffer beam in shaded gold digits.

During World War II, the engines were painted black. Red buffer beams and number plate and name plate backgrounds proved additional relief from the somber effect. However, No.81 received a coat of maroon paint in 1941 when it was overhauled at the Great Northern Railway of Ireland works at Dundalk in County Louth.

Post war livery continued to be black but enlivened by vermilion lining.

UTA
Following transfer of ownership to the UTA, locomotive No.80 Dunseverick Castle was turned out in an experimental olive green livery in late 1948.

However, the livery that the UTA finally adopted saw the engines painted black with vermilion and yellow lining. Buffer beams, name and number plate backgrounds were red and the practice of putting the number on the front buffer beam was continued.

The UTA roundel,  in diameter, with "Ulster Transport" in orange block capitals, lined in red, surrounding a white shield bearing the Red Hand of Ulster, all on a mid-green background, was placed in the middle of the tender sides.

Preservation
No.74 Dunluce Castle was restored into its original LMS (NCC) livery at the UTA's Duncrue Street workshops during late 1962 and in April 1963 was transferred to the Belfast Transport Museum. This locomotive is the only preserved NCC tender engine and can now be seen in the Ulster Folk and Transport Museum, Cultra, Holywood, Co. Down. BT18 0EU.

References
 
 
  
  [New engines]
  [Rebuilt engines]
 

Steam locomotives of Northern Ireland
Steam locomotives of Ireland
NBL locomotives
4-4-0 locomotives
U2
Railway locomotives introduced in 1924
Passenger locomotives
5 ft 3 in gauge locomotives